Sandy's Circus Adventure is an adventure video game developed by Philips Sidewalk Studio and published by Philips Interactive Media Benelux B.V.

References 

1991 video games
Adventure games
CD-i games
Video games about children
Video games developed in the United States
Video games set in amusement parks